Zabalza is a town and municipality located in the province and  autonomous community of Navarre, northern Spain. It may also refer to:
 Jorge Zabalza (born 1943), Uruguayan politician and former guerrilla fighter
 José María Zabalza (1928–1985), Spanish screenwriter and film director
 Miguel Zabalza (1896 – 1925), Spanish fencer
 Pedro Zabalza Arrospide (1913 - 1996), Uruguayan lawyer, rancher, and politician
 Pedro María Zabalza  (born 1944),  Spanish former football midfielder and manager